José María Cabral González (b. Santo Domingo, July 24, 1988) is a Dominican film director, screenwriter, and producer. He is considered one of the most important directors of the Dominican Republic. He has directed seven feature films. Cabral Gonzalez is recognized as the first Dominican filmmaker to be selected by the Sundance Film Festival with his movie ¨Woodpeckers¨.

Early life and family 
Cabral Gonzalez originally desired to be an actor. Consequently, he began filming short films in which he acted to be the main actor, Nevertheless, his work behind the camera caught his interest, then began his journey as a director.

He started financing his short films by having showings for each film in a movie theatre, renting the theatre for an hour, and selling tickets, to get a better budget for his next film.

Cabral was born into an upper-middle class family, to José María Cabral Arzeno and Ingrid Josefina González Fiallo. He is related to many prominent Dominicans such as Oscar de la Renta, Viriato Fiallo, J. Antinoe Fiallo, and Fabio Fiallo, by his mother’s side of the family; to Poppy Bermúdez and Carmen Imbert Brugal by his father’s side; and he is also related to José María Cabral, Juan Bautista Vicini Cabral, Peggy Cabral, Donald Reid Cabral, from both sides of his family.

Ancestry

Career
Cabral started making films when he was 16 years old, making private screenings of short films to family and friends in local movie theaters, one of them, "Excexos", got national distribution in 2008. His first feature film, Jaque Mate (2011), was screened at a high number of film festivals and selected as the Dominican entry for the Best Foreign Language Oscar at the 85th Academy Awards, but it did not make the final shortlist. "Arrobá" and "Despertar" followed in 2013 and 2014, also making it into the festival circuits. In 2015 he released "Detective Willy" a comedy adventure film. Cabral premiered his last film, "Carpinteros", in January at the 2017 Sundance Film Festival, a story about the realities and relationships of prisoners in Dominican jails.

Filmography 
 Excess, 2008
 Jaque Mate, 2011
 Arrobá, 2013
 Despertar, 2014
 Detective Willy, 2015
 Carpinteros, 2017
 El Proyeccionista, 2019

Carpinteros / Woodpeckers 
Screened in the World Cinema Dramatic Competition section of the 2017 Sundance Film Festival, Woodpeckers was the first Dominican feature film selected by Sundance.

Synopsis
Julián finds love and a reason for living in the last place imaginable: the Dominican Republic's Najayo Prison. His romance, with fellow prisoner Yanelly, must develop through sign language and without the knowledge of dozens of guards.

The film has been selected by other festivals:
 Guadalajara Film Festival, 2017
 Miami Film Festival, 2017
Havana Film Festival New York, 2017 - Winner of Havana Star Prize for Best Director

Sources cited

External links
 
 Biography for José María Cabral at IMDb.

1988 births
Living people
Descendants of Buenaventura Báez
Dominican Republic film directors
Dominican Republic male writers
Dominican Republic people of Canarian descent
Dominican Republic people of Catalan descent
Dominican Republic people of Dutch-Jewish descent
Dominican Republic people of English descent
Dominican Republic people of French descent
Dominican Republic people of German descent
Dominican Republic people of Italian descent
Dominican Republic people of Portuguese descent
Dominican Republic people of Taíno descent
Dominican Republic people of Walloon descent
White Dominicans